The Union Church of Istanbul is an interdenominational, international, protestant, evangelical church, meeting since 1857 in the Dutch Chapel, which is located on the grounds of the Consulate General of the Netherlands in Istanbul (formerly the Embassy). It is only a few minutes walk on Istiklal Caddesi towards Taksim Square from the Sishane Metro station.

History 
In 1667 Justinus Colyer was the Dutch representative in Istanbul. He bought a piece of land off the Grand Rue de Pera (now Istiklal Caddesi), and there built a wooden palace. In order to protect important documents and furniture from fire, he ordered in 1711 a stone building to be built. A Dutch Protestant congregation also met there, and, as it was built as a magazine rather than as a chapel, the gathering was tolerated by the Ottoman authorities. The wooden palace, burnt down in 1767 and 1831, and after the second fire the magazine was converted to a chapel.

Julius J.A. Count Van Zuylen van Nijevelt, who was then the Minister Resident, offered the Church to use the chapel in 1857. He had it repaired and full permission was granted by the King's Government in 1860. In 2007 the Church celebrated 150 years of worshipping in the Dutch Chapel.

In 1866, a Covenant and Creed was written and signed by 17 members, the name was also decided to be The Evangelical Union Church of Pera. The name was changed in 1966 to its current name, The Union Church of Istanbul.

Today 
Today the church prays for King Willem-Alexander every week, in gratitude for the use of the chapel. As of April 2015, the congregation was made up of 101 confessing members, and 141 registered attendees.

References

External links 
Union Church of Istanbul Webpage
Consulaat-generaal in Istanbul

Churches in Istanbul
1857 establishments in the Ottoman Empire
Protestantism in Turkey
Beyoğlu
Embassy chapels